Nobody Wins may refer to:
"Nobody Wins" (Radney Foster song)
"Nobody Wins" (Brenda Lee song (cover))
"Nobody Wins", a song by Kris Kristofferson
"Nobody Wins," a single from The Fox (Elton John album)